Judith El Zein (born 1 November 1976) is a French actress.

Filmography

Theater

References

External links

1976 births
Living people
French television actresses
French film actresses
French stage actresses
21st-century French actresses
Actresses from Paris